Count Władysław Tarnowski (June 4, 1836, Wróblewice, administrative district of Drohobycz, in modern day  UkraineApril 19, 1878, near San Francisco while on a steamer from Japan; also known by the literary pseudonym Ernest Buława (Ernest Mace)) was a pianist, composer, poet, dramatist, and translator.

Biography
He was the son of Count Walerian Spycimir Tarnowski and Ernestyna Tarnowska. Recognized as talented at an early age, he was introduced to famed composer Frédéric Chopin.  He studied in Lvov and Cracow, with Daniel-François-Esprit Auber at the Conservatoire de Paris, with a break during the time of the January Uprising of 1863-1864, during which he wrote the song "Jak to na wojence ładnie" ["Isn't the war fun"] which remains popular to the modern day, in various alterations.  He traveled widely, giving concerts in Wroclaw in 1860 and 1875, Lvov in 1875, Vienna, Venice and Firence in 1872, and Paris in 1873.

Compositions

Intimate
 String quartet in D major
Fantasia quasi una sonata (on violins and piano)
Souvenir d'un ange (Vienna about 1876, publ. V. Kratochwill)

Piano
3 Mazurkas (3 Mazurkas, Vienna about 1870, publ. Bösendorfer), I Mazurka, II Mazurka, III Mazurka
2 pieces : Chart sans paroles, Valse - poeme (both Leipzig c. 1870, publ. Ch. F Kahut)
Deux Morceaux : Fantazie-Impromptu, Valse-poeme
Impromptu "L'adieu de l'artiste" (Vienna c. 1870, publ. J. Gutmann)
 Symfonia d’un drammo d’amore (1871) 
Sonate pour piano composée et dediée a son ami Br. Zawadzki (Vienna c. 1875, publ. V. Kratochwill)
Grande polonaise quasi rhapsodies symphonique (Vienna c. 1875, publ. J. Gutmann)
Extases au Bosphor, fantasie rhapsodies sur les melodies orientales op. 10 (Leipzig c. 1875, publ. Forberg)
 Nocturne dédié à sa soeur Marie (Viena, n.d.)
Deux Nocturnes : „Nuit sombre”, „Nuit claire”
Ave Maria, dedicated to J. I. Kraszewski (in: Album Muzeum Narodowego w Rapperswyllu, 1876, pp.), (with Variations for choir and organ, and for string quartet)  
 Pensée funebre (before 1878) 
Andantino pensieroso ("Echo Muzyczne", Warszaw, issue 6, 17 XII 1878.)

Songs

Solo: 
 Uhlans march, called also Soldiers song, March soldier's Langiewicza with initial words: "A kto chce rozkoszy użyć”And who wants pleasure to use, and today more well-known with words "Jak to na wojence ładnie” <How this on war nicely> (first publications: „Kieszonkowy słowniczek polski z melodiami” Poznan 1889, publ.  J. Leitgebera and " War song” Lwow 1908, publ. B. Połoniecki, suitably).

With piano accompaniment:
 Cypryssen 5 characterische Gesänge (Vienna 1870, publ. Bösendorfera), fifth of the songs: Herangedämmert kam der Abend, Die Perle, Die Schwalben, Im Traum sah ich das Lieben, Ich sank verweint in sanften Schlummer 

 Neig, o Schöne Knospe, song to poem Mirza Shafi Vazeh 

 Zwei Gesänge mit Begleitung des Pianoforte – Du buch mit Siegen Siegeln, Ob Du Nun ruhst, songs to poem Ludwig Foglar (Vienna c. 1870, publ. V. Kratochwill)

 Zwei Gesänge: Klänge Und Schmerzen, Nächtliche Regung (Leipzig, c. 1870, publ. Ch. E. Kahnt)
 Au soleil couchant (1873) song to the poem by Victor Hugo 
 Still klingt das Glöcklein durch Felder (Vienna c. ~1875, publ. J. Gutmann) 

 Kennst du die Rosen., to own poem, (published J. Gutmann in Vienna.) 

 Mein Kahn - song to poem by Johann von Paümann ps. Hans Max (Wiedeń, wyd. Buchholz & Diedel)
 Alpuhara (1877) song to the poem by Adam Mickiewicz

Stage
 Achmed the oder the Pilger the Liebe (Achmed, pielgrzym milości>, to own libretto, based on the tale Washington Irving Legend of Prince Ahmed al Kamel, or, The Pilgrim of Love. from Tales of the Alhambra. The piano extract, Leipzig, c. 1875, publ. R. Forberg.)
 Karlinscy (music to own theatrical art, Vienna 1874, publ. V. Kratochwill)
 Joanna Grey (music to own theatrical art, Vienna 1875, publ. V. Kratochwill) 

The patron of the art, poems, the articles, reviews of literary works(ex. in „Ruch literacki”  and „Tygodnik ilustrowany”).

Literary works

Poetry

 Krople czary (The Drops of goblet) 1865
 Szkice helweckie i Talia (Helvetian drafts and Waist) 1868 (Leipzig, publ. P. Rhode)
 Piołuny (Absinthes) 1869
 Kochankowie ojczyzny (The Lovers of motherland) 1872

Dramas

 Karlińscy 1874 
 Joanna Grey (Jane Grey) 1875
 The Achmed the oder the Pilger the Liebe - libretto in German.

Publicist

 Articles and reviews  in „Ruch literacki”  and „Tygodnik ilustrowany”.

Documentary

 Archiwum Wróblewieckie (Lvov 1883, publ. Gubrynowicz and Schmidt; Poznan - Dresden 1869, publ. J. I. Kraszewski)

Translations
 The Osjan Song,
 Hamlet W. Shakespeare'a
 Works P.B. Shelley
 Works H. Haine
 P. Cornelius: Grundzüge der Geschichte der Musik, well-known with translated title: Zarys historii muzyki  ("Outline of history of music")>(Leipzig 1869).

References

 Encyklopedia muzyczna, publ. PWM 2009
 Encyklopedia muzyki, publ. PWN 2001
 Encyklopedia literatury, publ. PWN 2007
 Sir George Grove, (edited by Stanley Sadie) The New Grove Dictionary of Music and Musicians, II edition, Vol. 25 (Taiwan to Twelve Apostles), 2001, str. 103-104.
 Franz Stieger peralexikon, Part  II – Komponisten, Vol. 3 (N-Z), Verlegt Bei Hans Schneider, Tutzing, 1978, p. 1097.
 Franz Stieger Operalexikon, Part III – Libréttisten, Vol. 3 (Q-Z), Verlegt Bei Hans Schneider, Tutzing, 1981, p. 936.
 Pieśni niemieckie Władysława Tarnowskiego, M.T., OSDW AZYMUT Sp. z o. o., Warsaw-Lodz, 2017.
 Ewa Róża Janion Legends of Suli in Poland: some remarks on Władysław Tarnowski, pp. 46-49 in PhD thesis: Ewa Róża Janion Imaging Suli : Interactions between Philhellenic Ideas and Greek Identity Discourse, Peter Lang Publishing, Frankfurt, 2015.
 „Utwory instrumentalne Władysława Tarnowskiego”, M.T., OSDW AZYMUT Sp. z o.o., Warsaw-Lodz, 2018.
 Władysław Tarnowski „Artysta i cierpienie”, Vol. I, M.T., OSDW AZYMUT Sp. z o.o., Warsaw-Lodz, 2020.

External links

 Scores by Władysław Tarnowski in digital library Polona

Polish composers
1836 births
1878 deaths
Wladyslaw
19th-century composers
People from Lviv Oblast